Crombie may refer to:

People
Alexander Crombie (1762–1840), British educator, philosopher and Presbyterian minister
Alistair Cameron Crombie (1915–1996), Australian historian
Bonnie Crombie (born 1960), Canadian politician and current Mayor of Mississauga, Ontario
Cameron Crombie (born 1986), Australian para-athlete
David Crombie (born 1936), Canadian politician
Donald Crombie (born 1942), Australian film director, father of Fiona
Ed Crombie (born 1945), Canadian racecar driver
Elaine Crombie, Australian actress, daughter of Lillian 
Fiona Crombie, Australian costume and production designer, daughter of Donald
Jamie Crombie (born 1965), American-Canadian squash player
 John Crombie, founder of the Crombie (clothing), a clothing brand
Jonathan Crombie (1966–2015), Canadian actor
 Lillian Crombie (born 1958), Australian actress and dancer, mother of Elaine 
Noel Crombie (born 1953), musician (member of Split Enz)
Tony Crombie (1925–1999), English jazz drummer and bandleader
Tony Crombie, Commissioner of the British Antarctic Territory since 2004
Thomas Crombie Schelling (1921–2016), American economist

Fictional characters
Blake Crombie, fictional character from New Zealand soap opera Shortland Street

Other uses
Crombie (clothing), trade name for clothing made by the J&J Crombie company
Crombie Settlement, New Brunswick, a Canadian rural community in Victoria County, New Brunswick
Crombie REIT, Canadian property management company
DM Crombie, a military munitions storage depot on the Firth of Forth, Scotland